Berry and Co. is a 1921 collection of comic short stories by the English author Dornford Yates (Cecil William Mercer), his third book, featuring his recurring characters Bertram ('Berry') Pleydell, his wife and cousin Daphne Pleydell, Daphne's brother Boy Pleydell, another cousin Jonathan ('Jonah') Mansel, and Jonah's younger sister Jill Mansel.  The group of five - Berry, Daphne, Boy, Jonah and Jill - are collectively 'Berry and Co.'

Plot 
The book consists of short stories featuring Berry, Daphne, Boy, Jonah and Jill, set at 'White Ladies', Hampshire and at 'Cholmondeley Street', Mayfair in London in 1919 and 1920. In chapter 4, a Sealyham Terrier called Nobby joins the family. In the final story, Boy and Adèle (who had first appeared in The Courts of Idleness) become engaged.

Background 

All of the stories in Berry and Co. had originally appeared in The Windsor Magazine between December 1919 and December 1920. It was with the publication of Berry and Co. that Mercer finally made his mark as an author: the book proved to be extremely popular and was reprinted almost annually until the outbreak of the Second World War.

Chapters

Illustrations 

The illustrations from the Windsor stories were not included in the book version, although one of the illustrations by Norah Schlegel (1879-1963) from "A Double Event" was used to illustrate the dustjacket of the first edition. Her illustration for "A Trick Of Memory" was used as the basis for the cover illustration by Bill Dare of The Best of Berry (1989) in the Classic Thrillers series of paperbacks issued by  J.M.Dent & Sons Ltd.

Critical reception 
In his 1982 biography of the author, AJ Smithers noted that the stories in Berry and Co. are longer and much funnier than the earlier tales, and he called the book "as fresh as the day it left the printers." His view was that "the reading public of the time revelled in it; their grandchildren still do; very probably the same will be said by their own."

Richard Usborne in Clubland Heroes (1974) summarised a typical story: "Argument, persiflage, Berry over-ridden, plot, plot thickens, car chase, Berry goes off on sleeveless errand, Berry's long, 'priceless' Messenger's Speech ... Family tottering with laughter. Berry discomfited .. last word ... with Berry. End."

References

Bibliography
 
 

1921 short story collections
Ward, Lock & Co. books
Short story collections by Dornford Yates